Canada at the 2002 Commonwealth games was represented by a team that was selected by Commonwealth Games Canada (CGC). Canada is one of only six countries to have competed in all of the Commonwealth Games held since 1930 and was the host nation for the first games (then dubbed the British Empire Games) in Hamilton, Ontario.

At the 2002 Commonwealth games, Canada walked away with a total of 116 medals which placed them 3rd overall behind England and Australia

Medal results by events

References 

http://www.thecgf.com/games/country.asp
2002 Commonwealth Games results

Canada at the Commonwealth Games
Nations at the 2002 Commonwealth Games
2002 in Canadian sports